Robert Kropiwnicki (born 23 July 1974) is a Polish politician. He has been a member of the Sejm since 2010 representing the constituency of Legnica. In 2010, he replaced Janusz Mikulicz in the Sejm (6th term) and Kropiwnicki was re-elected in 2011 and in 2015 (7th and 8th term of the Sejm respectively). In 2019, he was again elected to the Sejm (9th term). He is affiliated with the Civic Platform party.

He was born in Legnica, Poland.

References 

Living people
1974 births
People from Legnica
21st-century Polish politicians
Members of the Polish Sejm 2007–2011
Members of the Polish Sejm 2011–2015
Members of the Polish Sejm 2015–2019
Members of the Polish Sejm 2019–2023
Civic Platform politicians